Puquina District is one of eleven districts of the General Sánchez Cerro Province in Peru.

Geography 

Other mountains are listed below:

References